Cheng Jiaru (born 4 March 1985) is an Olympic swimmer from China. She swam for China at the 2004 Olympics and the 2003 World Championships.

References

External links 
 
 
 

1985 births
Living people
Swimmers from Zhejiang
Chinese female freestyle swimmers
Olympic swimmers of China
Swimmers at the 2004 Summer Olympics
Sportspeople from Hangzhou
21st-century Chinese women